Weed Garden is an EP by American musician Iron & Wine. It was released on August 30, 2018 through Sub Pop.

Track listing

Charts

In other media 

 "Autumn Town Leaves" was used in the NBC series Manifest.

References

2018 EPs
Iron & Wine albums